Chummy is a nickname, and may refer to:

 Chummy Broomhall (1919–2017), American cross country skier
 Chummy Fleming (1863–1950), pioneer unionist
 Chummy MacGregor (1903–1973), American jazz keyboardist
 George Edward Gray, known as Chummy Gray (1873–1913), American baseball player

See also
 Chum  (disambiguation)